Mirishkor District is a district of Qashqadaryo Region in Uzbekistan. The capital lies at the town Yangi Mirishkor. The district consists of 3 urban-type settlements (Yangi Mirishkor, Jeynov, Pomuq) and 12 rural communities. It borders with Turkmenistan, Bukhara Region, Muborak District, Kasbi District, Nishon District.

Climate 
Mirishkor has a cold desert climate (Köppen climate classification BWk). The district has mild winters, but very hot and dry summers.

Economy
Natural resources include significant petroleum and natural gas reserves.  Major agricultural activities include cotton, various crops and livestock.

References

Qashqadaryo Region
Districts of Uzbekistan